Irwin Silverman is a professor of psychology at York University. With Marion Eals, he has studied sex differences in intelligence from the perspective of evolutionary psychology.

References

External links
Faculty page

Canadian psychologists
Evolutionary psychologists
Academic staff of York University
Living people
Brooklyn College alumni
University of Florida alumni
University of Rochester alumni
University at Buffalo faculty
Year of birth missing (living people)